Vishwanath Jadhav (1885−1964) was an Indian classical khyal singer and a disciple of Abdul Karim Khan, the founder of Kirana gharana (singing style).

Training
He learned under Abdul Karim from 1910 until the latter's death in 1937. He also took lessons from  1906 to 1910 Nissar Hussain Khan of Gwalior gharana.

Career
Jadhav was appointed a court musician of the former princely state of Kolhapur by Chhatrapati Shahu Maharaj in 1920s. He had also been invited to perform on various occasions by  Maharaja Krishna Raja Wodaiyar IV, the Maharaja of Mysore State. In 1936, he was also bestowed the title of "Proudh Gandharva" by Wodaiyar. He used to also perform at the royal functions of Sangli State. Being friends with Dinanath Mangeshkar, he also taught the veteran Bollywood singer Lata Mangeshkar in her childhood days at Sangli.

Jadhav composed music for films in the early talkie era. He was the music composer of the 1937 film Gangavataran. The film was written and directed by Dadasaheb Phalke, who is known as the "father of Indian cinema". It was the first sound film and the last film to be directed by Phalke. In 1938, he also composed music for the mythological film Dhurva Kumar based on Dhruva's story. The film starred actors Kumar Prabhakar and Raja Paranjape.

On 4 April 1952, Pandit Vishwanathbuwa was honoured by the first President of India, Dr. Rajendra Prasad, at the golden jubilee celebrations of the Gandharva Mahavidyalaya at Delhi.

Legacy
He has three sons, who are also classical singers of repute. The Pandit Vishwanathbuwa Jadhav Memorial Committee (PVJMC) which promotes Hindustani music. In May 2012, the committee submitted a collection of about 500 notations of various bandishes that Pandit Jadhavbuwa preserved of his learning from his gurus Ustad Nissar Hussein Khan and Ustad Abdul Karim Khan, to a Pune-based group the "Pune Bharat Gayan Samaj" (PBGS).

Discography 
"Proudh Gandharva" Pandit Vishwanathbuwa Jadhav

(following 'Raga' recodings con be heard on Youtube Links as audio- visual presentations.) links-

SWAR-MANDIR -
SHARDA SANGEET VIDYALYA, KOLHAPUR

Photo Gallery

References

Further reading 
 Hamare Sangeet Ratna (Hindi, pg. 392)- Shri Laxmi Narayan Garg – Editor, Sangeet Karyalaya, Hathras (UP)
 Thor Sangeetkaranchi Parampara (Marathi, pg. 82-89) (Marathi Biographical Essays- By Prof. B. R. Deodhar) – First Edition 2007
 Film Udyogee Dadasaheb Phalke (Marathi, pg. 64, 93)- Shri Gangadhar Mhambre – First Edition - 15 November 2004.

External links 
 
 
SWAR-MANDIR -
SHARDA SANGEET VIDYALYA, KOLHAPUR

1885 births
1964 deaths
Kirana gharana
Gwalior gharana
Hindustani composers
Indian film score composers
20th-century Indian musicians
20th-century Indian male classical singers
20th-century Khyal singers